Heber Daniel García Torrealba (born 27 March 1997) is a Venezuelan football player who plays as midfielder for Deportivo La Guaira.

Club statistics

Honours

International
Venezuela U-20
FIFA U-20 World Cup: Runner-up 2017
South American Youth Football Championship: Third Place 2017

References

1997 births
Living people
Venezuelan footballers
Venezuela under-20 international footballers
Venezuelan expatriate footballers
Portuguesa F.C. players
Deportivo La Guaira players
Sud América players
Curicó Unido footballers
Venezuelan Primera División players
Chilean Primera División players
Uruguayan Primera División players
Expatriate footballers in Chile
Expatriate footballers in Uruguay
Association football midfielders
21st-century Venezuelan people
People from San Felipe, Venezuela